Hang in There, Kids! (Atayal: Lokah Laqi) is a 2016 Taiwanese drama film directed by Laha Mebow. It was selected as the Taiwanese entry for the Best Foreign Language Film at the 89th Academy Awards but it was not nominated.

Cast
 Albee Huang
 Sharon Kao
 Buya Watan
 Watan Silan
 Suyan Pito

Awards and nominations

See also
 List of submissions to the 89th Academy Awards for Best Foreign Language Film
 List of Taiwanese submissions for the Academy Award for Best Foreign Language Film

References

External links
 

2016 films
2016 drama films
Taiwanese drama films
Atayal-language films
Indigenous films
2010s Mandarin-language films